Yedda Chen 陈彦妃(born February 4, 1984) is a Chinese actress and model.

Life and education 
She was born in Zhoushan County in Zhejiang Province. She studied piano and ballet at school. She stands at 173 cm and weighs 48 kg. She started her career as a model. She graduated from Xie Jin of Shanghai Normal University College of film and Television Arts.

TV series

References

1984 births
Living people
Actresses from Zhejiang
Chinese female models
People from Zhoushan
Chinese television actresses